Jorge Luis Pupo (born February 14, 1982 in Pinar del Río) is a Cuban diver, who specialized in individual and synchronized springboard events. Pupo competed for the 3 m individual springboard event at the 2008 Summer Olympics in Beijing, along with his compatriot Jorge Betancourt. He placed twenty-seventh in the preliminary round of the competition, with a total score of 388.70 points. In 2011, Pupo, and his partner Rene Hernandez won a bronze medal for the men's 3 m synchronized springboard event at the Pan American Games in Guadalajara, Mexico, with an overall score of 384.33 points.

References

External links
NBC 2008 Olympics profile

Cuban male divers
Living people
Olympic divers of Cuba
Divers at the 2008 Summer Olympics
People from Pinar del Río
1982 births
Divers at the 2011 Pan American Games
Pan American Games bronze medalists for Cuba
Pan American Games medalists in diving
Medalists at the 2011 Pan American Games
21st-century Cuban people